Boulos, also transliterated Boulus, Boolos, Bulos, Bulus etc., is the Arabic form of the name Paul. It can be used as a male given name, or as a surname. 
It may refer to

Given name
Paul II Cheikho (1906–1989), Iraqi patriarch of the Chaldean Catholic Church
Bulus Farah (born ca. 1910), Palestinian trade unionist
Paulos Faraj Rahho (1942–2008) Chaldean Catholic Archeparch of Mosul, Iraq

Surname
Bahnam Zaya Bulos (born 1944), Iraqi Assyrian Christian politician
Christophe Boulos (born 1996), Lebanese track and field sprinter
George Boolos (1940–1996), American philosopher and mathematical logician
Guilherme Boulos (born 1982), Brazilian political and social activist, professor and writer
Issa Boulos (born 1968), Palestinian-American musician
Jimmy Bulus (born 1986), Nigerian footballer
John Boulos (1921–2002), Haitian-American football (soccer) player
Kimberly Boulos (b. 1987), Haitian soccer player
Maged N. Kamel Boulos, British health informatician
Daniel Boulos (born 1994), Lebanese-American engineer
Michael Boulos (born 1997), Nigerian-American business executive and husband of Tiffany Trump
Michel Boulos (born 1976), Canadian sabre fencer
Michelle Boulos (born 1988), American figure skater
Mikaella Boulos (born 1992), Lebanese actress and architect
Philippe Najib Boulos (1902–1979), Lebanese lawyer and politician
Reginald Boulos (born 1956), third generation Lebanese-Haitian medical doctor and businessman
Sargon Boulus (1944–2007), Iraqi Assyrian poet and short story writer

Company 

 Boulos Enterprises, a Nigerian motorcycle company who Michael Boulos is the heir of

Arabic masculine given names
Arabic-language surnames
Coptic given names